The CFL player dispersal draft was held with the disbanding of the Ottawa Renegades franchise in 2006. The draft took place on April 12 and consisted of eight rounds, with Kerry Joseph being selected first overall by Saskatchewan.

Draft Results

References

2006 in Canadian football
Ottawa Renegades